Pekka Juhani Suomela (born 15 June 1938) is a Finnish former sports shooter. He competed in the 50 metre running target event at the 1972 Summer Olympics.

References

External links
 

1938 births
Living people
Finnish male sport shooters
Olympic shooters of Finland
Shooters at the 1972 Summer Olympics
Sportspeople from Tampere